Still My Moment is the second commercial mixtape by American rapper Tee Grizzley. It was released on November 9, 2018, by 300 Entertainment. The mixtape features guest appearances from Quavo, Offset, Chance the Rapper, and Lil Pump. It debuted at number 29 on the Billboard 200.

Critical reception
The album received positive reviews from HotNewHipHop and HipHopDX.

Track listing

Charts

References

2018 mixtape albums
Tee Grizzley albums